This list comprises all players who have participated in at least one league match for Carolina Dynamo in the USL Premier Development League since the USL began keeping detailed records in 2003. Players who were on the roster but never played a first team game are not listed; players who appeared for the team in other competitions (US Open Cup, etc.) but never actually made an USL appearance are noted at the bottom of the page where appropriate.

A "*" denotes players who are known to have appeared for the team prior to 2003.

A
  Eddie Ababio
  Lyle Adams
  Chugger Adair*
  Ryan Adeleye
  Mike Adeyemi
  Jon Akin*
  Yari Allnutt*
  Patrick Althoff
  Jalil Anibaba
  Kevin Arguello
  Steve Armas
  Christopher Arnold
  Cody Arnoux
  Maher Atta*
  Matthew Avren

B
  Todd Bailess*
  David Balfrey*
  John Ball*
  Marcos Balladores
  Michael Balogun
  Mike Banesse*
  Eric Barnes
  David Beall*
  Jamar Beasley*
  Dale Beattie*
  Djamel Bekka
  Tim Bender
  Jay Benfield
  Mario Benjamin*
  Dwayne Bergeron
  Nassim Berhouni
  Nathaniel Berry
  Corben Bone
  Ronnie Bouemboue
  Alan Branigan*
  Dane Brenner
  Robert Brenner
  Keiran Breslin*
  Cameron Brown
  Matt Brown
  Derek Brownell*
  Dillon Brunk
  David Buehler*
  Vince Bueno*
  Adrian Bumbut
  Kenny Bundy
  Kevin Burk*
  Jon Busch*
  Kris Byrd
  Peter Byaruhanga †

C
  Robert Scott Campbell
  Thomas Campbell
  Danny Care*
  Luis Carrizosa
  Ryan Caugherty
  Robin Chan*
  Michael Chesler
  Marco Chung*
  Dominic Cianciarulo
  El-Hadj Cisse
  Clinton Collins
  Dan Collins*
  Glen Collins
  John Cone*
  David Cossu*
  Nick Courtney
  Benjamin Cowherd
  Warren Creavalle
  Hugh Cronin
  Sam Cronin
  Jason Cudjoe
  Deon Cuffie-Joseph
  Kyle Cupid

D
  Heath Danford*
  Miguel Da Silva
  Robert Dabbs
  Chad Dalton
  Casey Davis
  Jeff Davis
  Preston Davis
  Ryan Davis
  Del Deanus*
  Keith DeFini*
  Luciano Delbono
  Josue Destine*
  Joe Dorini
  Brock Duckworth
  Dan Dudley*
  Adam Duff*
  James Dunn*

E
  Brian Edwards
  Jökull Elísabetarson
  Mark Ellington
  Jose Epsindola*
  Chris Estridge

F
  Greg Fallon*
  Jesus Falvino
  Michael Farrell
  Jeremy Fedor*
  Lester Felician*
  Thomas Finlay*
  Sean Finn*
  Jim Finnerty*
  Carl Fleming*
  Buddy Forward
  Josh Fouts*
  Bradley Franks
  Floyd Franks
  Jamie Franks
  Brian Freeman*
  Robert Fricke
  Matt Friel
  Mark Fulk*
  Ray Fumo

G
  Mike Gailey*
  Gabe Garcia*
  Scott Garlick*
  Tim Garlick*
  Eli Garner
  Troy Garner*
  Tony Gasser*
  Denis Geoffrey
  Simon Gislimberti*
  Jimmy Glenn*
  Chris Goos
  Mike Gosselin*
  Tarik Guendouzi
  Steve Guinan*

H
  John Hackworth*
  John Hatchet*
  Brian Harrison
  Ayman Hamid*
  Ryan Hartman*
  Brian Harrison
  Jason Haupt*
  Daniel Haywood
  Aidan Heaney*
  Patrik Hefti*
  Mike Hemphil*
  Vladimir Henderson*
  Guillermo Henriques-Jimenez
  Allen Higgins*
  John Howard*
  Justin Hughes
  Ben Hunter
  Andy Hylton*

I
  Erfan Imeni
  Clinton Irwin
  John Izzo

J
  Brian Japp*
  Richard Jata
  Stern John*
  Aaron Johnson
  Ryan Johnson
  Mark Jonas*
  Scott Jones
  Slade Jones*
  Emmanuel Joseph

K
  Nansha Kalonji
  David Kawesi-Mukooza*
  Mark Kelly*
  Steven Kinney
  Nathan Kipp*
  Andy Kish*
  Matt Knowles*
  Reggie Koranteng
  Eric Kvello*

L
  Michael Lahoud
  Jerry Laterza*
  Joseph Lazorchick
  Christopher Lebo
  Erwin La Crom*
  Paul Leese*
  Cameron Lewis
  Garry Lewis
  Justin Lichtfuss
  Mark Linville
  Jeffrey Lochrie
  Brian Loftin*
  Alex Long
  Mario Longo*
  Amir Lowery
  Jon Lowery*
  Zach Loyd
  Dennis Ludwig*
  Zen Luzniak*

M
  Shawn Mahoney*
  Alexander Maslow
  Donny Mark*
  Stephen McCarthy
  Dustin McCarty
  Darran McDonough*
  Mike McGinty*
  Randy McLeod
  Tim Merritt
  Mark Millard
  Tom Miscuraca*
  Byron Mitchell*
  Justin Moose
  Jorge Mora
  Phil Moyer*
  David Moxom*
  Matthew Mulvena
  Arie Muniz
  Alberto Munoz*
  Rumbani Munthali*
  Aidan Murphy*

N
  Justin Neimann*
  Ben Newnam
  Junior Nombre

O
  E. J. O'Keeffe
  Mo Oduor*
  Fejiro Okiomah
  Karo Okiomah
  Matt Olson*
  Matthew O'Toole
  Joe Owen*

P
  David Palmer
  Pete Palomino
  Anastasios Paparounis
  T.J. Papp*
  Brett Paschall
  Randi Patterson
  Anthony Peters
  Mark Peters*
  Devin Peyton*
  Ed Pinon*
  Todd Polhemus*
  Mike Poole*
  Adrian Powell*
  Darren Powell*

R
  Ed Radwanski*
  Bradford Ramsey
  Todd Ray
  Stephen Rhyne
  Josh Rice
  Keith Rice*
  Kevin Rice*
  James Riley
  Courtney Rimmer
  Jim Rinker*
  Daniel Roberts
  Darryl Roberts*
  Chris Robinson
  Mike Rock*
  David Rodriguez
  Scott Rojo
  T. J. Rolfing
  Richard Ronemus*
  Robert Rosario*
  Matt Rose
  Michael Rose
  Blake Roth

S
  Shea Salinas
  Jon Samford*
  Jerome Samuels*
  Mike Saunders*
  Taylor Saxe
  Josef Schroeder*
  Scott Schweitzer*
  Tim Seibert
  Musa Shannon*
  Richard Sharpe*
  Kevin Shaw*
  James Shoffner*
  Brian Shriver
  Jamal Shteiwi
  Wesley Shull
  Kevin Sloan*
  Adam Sloustcher
  Donnie Smith
  Indy Smith
  Khano Smith
  Ryan Solle
  Josue Soto
  Steve Springthorpe*
  Kevin Stam
  John Stark*
  Khary Stockton*
  Marcus Storey
  Matt Strine

T
  Osei Telesford
  Marcellus Tennyson
  Scott Thelen*
  Aaron Thomas*
  Chris Thomas*
  Wells Thompson
  David Torris*
  Marcus Tracy
  Matt Tuttle

U
  David Ulmsten*
  David Upchurch*
  Kirk Urso

V
  Joey Valenti*
  Josh Villalobos
  Michael Volk

W
  Mike Wakeman*
  Jon Waters*
  Kelly Weadock*
  Steve Weiger*
  Jamie Wellington*
  Daniel Wenzel
  Mike Williams*
  Sheanon Williams
  Nate Winkel*
  Tanner Wolfe
  David Worthen
  Jay Wyatt
  Brad Wylde*

Z
  Ilija Zlater*

Sources

2010 Carolina Dynamo stats
2009 Carolina Dynamo stats
2008 Carolina Dynamo stats
2007 Carolina Dynamo stats
2006 Carolina Dynamo stats
2005 Carolina Dynamo stats
2004 Carolina Dynamo stats
2003 Carolina Dynamo stats

References

Carolina Dynamo
 
Association football player non-biographical articles